The 2019–20 Punjab F.C. Season was the club's fourth season in the I-League.

Sponsors

Transfers

In

Out

Squad

Team management

Competitions

I-League

See also
 2019–20 in Indian football
 2019–20 I-League

References

Minerva Punjab F.C.
RoundGlass Punjab FC seasons